The Murder Inc Story is an American five-part television documentary series which premiered on August 9, 2022 on BET.

Episodes

References

External links

2020s American documentary television series
2020s American television miniseries
2022 American television series debuts
2022 American television series endings
BET original programming
English-language television shows
Historical television series